Pleurotomoides is a genus of gastropods belonging to the family Clathurellidae. 

The genus has almost cosmopolitan distribution.

Species
 Pleurotomoides barnardi 
 † Pleurotomoides fascinellus 
 † Pleurotomoides fuschi 
 † Pleurotomoides gemmatus 
 † Pleurotomoides hordeaceus 
 † Pleurotomoides lapicidinae 
 †Pleurotomoides lienardioides 
 Pleurotomoides lyciaca  (nomen dubium)
 † Pleurotomoides milletii 
 †Pleurotomoides pagoda 
 Pleurotomoides petiti 
 † Pleurotomoides poustagnacensis 
 † Pleurotomoides pouweri 
 † Pleurotomoides pyrenaicus 
 † Pleurotomoides ringens 
 † Pleurotomoides robbai 
 †Pleurotomoides rupina 
 † Pleurotomoides serventii 
 † Pleurotomoides strombillus 
 † Pleurotomoides sublaevigatus 
 † Pleurotomoides suturalis 
 † Pleurotomoides vanderdoncki 
 † Pleurotomoides variabilis 
Synonyms
 Pleurotomoides decaryi Dautzenberg, 1932: synonym of Tylotiella decaryi (Dautzenberg, 1932) (original combination)
 Pleurotomoides gemmata Lozouet, 2017 †: synonym of Pleurotomoides gemmatus Lozouet, 2017 † (wrong gender agreement of specific epithet)
 Pleurotomoides imperati (Scacchi, 1835) †: synonym of Aphanitoma imperati (Scacchi, 1835) †
 Pleurotomoides maculosa (Pease, 1863): synonym of Kermia maculosa (Pease, 1863)
 Pleurotomoides obliquispira F. Nordsieck, 1977: synonym of Coralliophila meyendorffii (Calcara, 1845)
 Pleurotomoides punctifera (Garrett, 1873): synonym of Kermia punctifera (Garrett, 1873): synonym of Pseudodaphnella punctifera (Garrett, 1873)
 Pleurotomoides pyrenaica (Peyrot, 1931) †: synonym of Pleurotomoides pyrenaicus (Peyrot, 1931) † (wrong gender agreement of specific epithet)
 Pleurotomoides subcostellatus (d'Orbigny, 1852) †: synonym of Pleurotomoides sublaevigatus (Grateloup, 1845) †
 Pleurotomoides tessellata (Hinds, 1843): synonym of Kermia tessellata (Hinds, 1843)
 Pleurotomoides thespesia (Melvill & Standen, 1896): synonym of Kermia thespesia (Melvill & Standen, 1896)

References

 Dautzenberg P. (1929). Contribution à l'étude de la faune de Madagascar: Mollusca marina testacea. Faune des colonies françaises, 3(4): 321-636, pls 4-7. Société d'Editions géographiques, maritimes et coloniales, Paris

External links
 Millet P.-A. (1827) Mémoire sur un nouveaux genre (Defrancia) de coquilles de la familie de Zoophages. Mémoires de la Société Linnéenne de Paris, 5: 437–441, pl. 9

Gastropods